Landang, comes from Buli or Buri Tree (Corypha), a type of palm found in the Philippines and other tropical countries. This tree only flowers once in its life and then dies. At first glance, landang looks like shrunken, flattened sago. It is traditionally used in making binignit in the Visayan region of the Philippines.

Preparation

The process is very similar in making sago. First, the buli palm is felled. The hard core can be reached by breaking the trunk open. The hard core is chopped into fragments that should be dried perfectly and hand crushed into powder form thereby turning it into flour. This process requires several rounds of pounding. This is then mixed with water to form the product. It can be stored for weeks or a few months.

Uses

Landang is essential in making the traditional Visayan binignit or vegetable stew usually eaten during the Lenten season in the Philippines when almost everyone is fasting.

Botany

This type of palm is usually found in tropical areas of South Central Asia particularly in India thru the Philippines and some parts of northern Australia. It would grow on different soil types and may reach 20 meters high and would bear up to a million flowers. It is one of the largest palms. It is slow growing and doesn't want to be disturbed once planted. It would require an abundance of sunlight and much water. Like all the Corypha family, it only flowers once during maturity and dies after.

References

Philippine cuisine
Food ingredients